South Township is a township in Dade County, in the U.S. state of Missouri.

South Township lies in the southern part of Dade County, hence the name.

References

Townships in Missouri
Townships in Dade County, Missouri